Leopold IV may refer to:
 Leopold IV, Duke of Anhalt (1794–1871)
 Leopold IV, Duke of Austria (1371–1411)
 Leopold IV, Duke of Bavaria (–1141)
 Leopold IV, Prince of Lippe (1871–1949)